is a junction passenger railway station located in the city of Kameyama, Mie Prefecture, Japan, owned by Central Japan Railway Company (JR Central).

Lines
Kameyama Station is served by the Kansai Main Line and is located 59.9 kilometers from Nagoya Station on the Kansai Main Line. It is also the northern terminal station of the Kisei Main Line and is located 180.2 kilometers from the opposing terminal of the JR Central portion of the line at Shingū Station and 384.2 kilometers from the ultimate terminal of the JR West portion of the line at Wakayamashi Station.

Layout
The station consists of one side platform and two island platforms, serving five tracks, connected by an elevated  concourse. The station has a Midori no Madoguchi staffed ticket office.

Platforms

History
Kameyama Station was opened on December 25, 1890, as a station on the Kansai Railway. The Kansai Railway was nationalized on October 1, 1907, and the station became part of the Imperial Government Railways (IGR) system. A new station building was completed on November 3, 1913. The IGR became Japan National Railways (JNR) after World War II. The station was absorbed into the JR Central network upon the privatization of JNR on April 1, 1987. A new station building was completed in 2012.

Station numbering was introduced to the section of the Kansai Main Line operated JR Central in March 2018; Kameyama Station was assigned station number CI17.

Passenger statistics
In fiscal 2019, the station was used by an average of 2,156 passengers daily (boarding passengers only).

Surrounding area
 Kameyama Shrine
 Kameyama Castle Ruins
 Kameyama City Hall
 Kameyama Museum of History
 Kameyama City Library

See also
 List of railway stations in Japan

References

External links

 Official website (JR Central) 
 Official website (JR-West) 

Railway stations in Japan opened in 1890
Railway stations in Mie Prefecture
Kameyama, Mie